The Medal "For the Defence of Sevastopol" was a World War II campaign medal of the Soviet Union established on December 22, 1942 by decree of the Presidium of the Supreme Soviet of the USSR to reward the participants of the defence of the port city of Sevastopol against the armed forces of Nazi Germany and Romania. The medal's statute was amended on July 18, 1980 by decree of the Presidium of the Supreme Soviet of the USSR № 2523-X.

Medal statute 
The Medal "For the Defence of Sevastopol" was awarded to all participants in the defence of Sevastopol - soldiers of the Red Army, Navy and troops of the NKVD, as well as persons from the civilian population who took part in the defence of Sevastopol during its siege by German and Romanian forces.

Award of the medal was made on behalf of the Presidium of the Supreme Soviet of the USSR on the basis of documents attesting to actual participation in the defence of Sevastopol issued by the unit commander, the chief of the military medical establishment or by a relevant provincial or municipal authority.  Serving military personnel received the medal from their unit commander, retirees from military service received the medal from a regional, municipal or district military commissioner in the recipient's community, members of the civilian population, participants in the defence of Sevastopol received their medal from regional or city Councils of People's Deputies.

The Medal "For the Defence of Sevastopol" was worn on the left side of the chest and in the presence of other awards of the USSR, was located immediately after the Medal "For the Defence of Odessa".  If worn in the presence of Orders or medals of the Russian Federation, the latter have precedence.

Medal description 
The Medal "For the Defence of Sevastopol" was a 32mm in diameter circular brass medal with a raised rim. In the center of the obverse, a 22mm in diameter convex medallion bearing the overlapping left profile busts of a red sailor over a helmeted red soldier. At the bottom, protruding below the edge of the central medallion, the bottom of a naval anchor and the breeches or two muzzle loading cannons (crossing under the medallion); at the top, protruding from the central medallion, the muzzles of the two cannons, in between them, a 5mm wide frame bearing a relief five-pointed star. On the reverse near the top, the relief image of the hammer and sickle, below the image, the relief inscription in three rows "FOR OUR SOVIET MOTHERLAND".

The Medal "For the Defence of Sevastopol" was secured by a ring through the medal suspension loop to a standard Soviet pentagonal mount covered by a 24mm wide olive green silk moiré ribbon with a 2mm central dark blue stripe.

Recipients (partial list)
The individuals below were all recipients of the Medal "For the Defence of Sevastopol".

Anatoly Petrovich Alexandrov
Semyon Budyonny
Yakov Timofeyevich Cherevichenko
Archil Gelovani
Vasily Glagolev
Hovhannes Stepani Isakov
Yevgeny Khaldei
Nikolay Krylov
Gordey Ivanovich Levchenko
 Filipp Sergeyevich Oktyabrskiy
 Lyudmila Pavlichenko
 Ivan Yefimovich Petrov
 Vasily Ivanovich Petrov
Vitaly Popkov
 Michael Petrovich Tsiselsky
Lev Anatolevich Vladimirsky
Aleksey Vysotsky

See also 
Awards and decorations of the Soviet Union
Sevastopol
Hero City
Siege of Sevastopola

References

External links 
 Legal Library of the USSR

Soviet campaign medals
Military awards and decorations of the Soviet Union
1942 establishments in the Soviet Union
Awards established in 1942